Melaje is a village in the municipality of Tutin, Serbia. According to the 2002 census, the village has a population of 431 people.

Demographics 
In the 1953 Yugoslav census, 2018 inhabitants were registered. 1056 identified as Yugoslavs, 480 as Albanians, 343 as Turks and 104 as Serbs.

References

Populated places in Raška District